Music for the Age of Miracles is the sixth studio album by English indie pop band The Clientele. It was released on 22 September 2017 by Merge Records in the United States and Tapete Records in Europe.

Background
On June 15 it was announced that "Music For the Age Of Miracles" would be released on September 22 on Merge Records and the first single from the album, "Lunar Days", was shared online. On August 9, a second single, "Everyone You Meet", was shared alongside a video for the song. On September 14, one week before the album's release, a third single, "Everything You See Tonight Is Different From Itself", was shared online. On October 30, a video for the opening song on the album, "The Neighbour", was also released.

Track listing

Personnel
Credits for Music for the Age of Miracles adapted from album liner notes.

The Clientele
 Alasdair MacLean – vocals, guitar, tape, arrangement
 James Hornsey – bass
 Mark Keen – drums, percussion, piano, arrangement

Additional musicians
 Barbara Bartz – violin
 Leon Beckenham – trumpet
 Freddie Bois – trumpet
 Anne Gray – tenor recorder
 Anthony Harmer – guitar, vocals, piano, keyboards, percussion, beats, brass and string arrangements and conducting
 Joyce Efia Harmer – descant recorder
 Mary Lattimore – harp
 Sebastian Millett – cello
 Lupe Núñez-Fernández – vocals
 Dave Oxley – French horn

Production
 Anthony Harmer – recording
 Jeff Lipton – mastering
 Brian O'Shaughnessy – recording
 Maria Rice – mastering (assistant)
 Shuta Shinoda – recording

Artwork and design
 Daniel Murphy – design

Charts

References

External links
 
 

2017 albums
The Clientele albums
Tapete Records albums